Michael Scholz (26 January 1949) is a German singer, composer, and producer. He was part of the choir of Rolf Köhler.

Between 1984 and 2000, he collaborated with Dieter Bohlen for which he sang in the Modern Talking and Blue System choruses. Since 2003, he works on his music group, Systems in Blue.

His voice type is falsetto.

See also 
 Rolf Köhler
 Detlef Wiedeke

References

External links 

1949 births
Living people
German male singers
German pop singers
German songwriters
German session musicians
German male musicians
Modern Talking